Papyrus Oxyrhynchus 30 (P. Oxy. 30) is a historical fragment in Latin. It was discovered by Grenfell and Hunt in 1897 in Oxyrhynchus. The fragment is dated to the third century. It is housed in the Department of Manuscripts of the British Library. The text was published by Grenfell and Hunt in 1898.

The manuscript was written on vellum in the form of a codex. The measures of a single leaf are 86 by 50 mm. The text is written in an uncial letters. The words are not divided at the end of lines. The subject of the composition was probably the Macedonian wars.

See also 
 Oxyrhynchus Papyri
 Papyrus Oxyrhynchus 29
 Papyrus Oxyrhynchus 31

References 

030
3rd-century manuscripts
Macedonian Wars
British Library collections